Doncaster Borough Police was the police force operating in the county borough of Doncaster, England from 1836 until 1 October 1968. The force was then merged with others to form a West Yorkshire Constabulary.  From 1974 its area passed to the South Yorkshire Police.

References

Doncaster
Defunct police forces of England